Jérémy Frick (born 8 March 1993) is a Swiss professional footballer who plays as a goalkeeper for the Swiss club Servette.

Professional career
A youth product of Servette and Lyon, Frick moved to the senior team of Servette in 2016.

References

External links
 
 OL Profile
 Servette FC Profile
 SFL Profile
 FODB Profile

1993 births
Living people
Footballers from Geneva
Swiss men's footballers
Switzerland youth international footballers
Servette FC players
FC Biel-Bienne players
Swiss Super League players
Swiss Challenge League players
Championnat National 2 players
Association football goalkeepers
Swiss expatriate footballers
Expatriate footballers in France
Swiss expatriate sportspeople in France